Masters of the Dark Arts is the second studio album by La Coka Nostra released on July 31, 2012. The album features guests including Vinnie Paz, Sean Price, Thirstin Howl III, Sick Jacken and Big Left.

Track listing

Reception 
Adam Fleischer of XXL magazine noted that "La Coka Nostra remain decidedly true to their core with their new album" and "that they are indeed masters of the dark arts". HipHopDX gave the album a positive review and noted that the album was a "sinister, happily violent detour from the pop-centric". Peter Marrack of Exclaim also gave the album a positive review and noted that the album was "more or less a one-way ticket to hell". Nathan G. O'Brien of Scene Point Blank gave it four out five star and said "with Master of the Dark Arts La Coka Nostra’s pluperfect union of bombastic boom-bap, record scratching, and realism-based hardcore rhyming".

Charts

References 

2012 albums
La Coka Nostra albums
Albums produced by DJ Lethal
Albums produced by DJ Premier
Albums produced by Statik Selektah
Fat Beats Records albums